W.S.Q. is a 1980 album by the jazz group the World Saxophone Quartet released on the Italian Black Saint label. The album features performances and compositions by Hamiet Bluiett, Julius Hemphill, Oliver Lake and David Murray.

Reception

The album was identified by Chris Kelsey in his AllMusic essay "Free Jazz: A Subjective History" as one of the 20 Essential Free Jazz Albums.

The AllMusic review by Scott Yanow awarded the album 4 stars, stating, "There is plenty of variety to the third album by the unique World Saxophone Quartet. The music ranges from nearly free improvisations to the four-part "Suite Music," which was almost completely written out. Rather than being a screamfest for the four innovative saxophonists..., this is a well constructed and sometimes surprisingly accessible (although always explorative) program."

The authors of the Penguin Guide to Jazz Recordings awarded the album 4 stars, calling it "the best of the earlier records," and noting that it is "dominated by a long suite that blends jazz and popular elements with considerable ingenuity and real improvisational fire." They stated that "Fast Life" is "as fine a curtain-piece as the group has recorded."

Track listing
 "Sundance" (Bluiett) - 2:38  
 "Plainsong" (Hemphill) - 4:19  
 "Connections" (Hemphill) - 8:06  
 "W.S.Q." (Lake) - 5:15  
 "Pillars Latino" (Hemphill) - 5:19  
 "Suite Music: The Key/Ballad for Eddie Jefferson/Pam-Maw/Hattie Wall" (Bluiett) - 5:24  
 "Sound Light" (Lake) - 5:35  
 "Fast Life" (Murray) - 2:59

Personnel
Hamiet Bluiett — baritone saxophone
Julius Hemphill — alto saxophone
Oliver Lake — alto saxophone
David Murray — tenor saxophone

References

1980 albums
Black Saint/Soul Note albums
World Saxophone Quartet albums